La Visitation-de-Yamaska is a municipality in the Centre-du-Québec region of the province of Quebec in Canada. The population as of the Canada 2021 Census was 295.

Demographics

Population
Population trend:

Language
Mother tongue language (2006)

See also
List of municipalities in Quebec

References

External links

(Google Maps)

Municipalities in Quebec
Incorporated places in Centre-du-Québec
Nicolet-Yamaska Regional County Municipality